Abū Shu'ayb ad-Dukkālī as-Sadīqī (1878–1937) was a Moroccan scholar, minister, educator, and pioneer of Salafism in Morocco. He was referred to by the title Shaykh al-Islām.

Biography 
He was born in 1878 to a modest family from a rural area called as-Sadiqat near al-Gharbiya in Dukkala. His family was affiliated with the Darqawi Sufi order and studied Ibn Ata Allah al-Iskandari's . 

He studied at Al-Azhar University in Cairo and lectured at Al-Azhar and at az-Zaytuna in Tunis.

Among his students was Muhammad al-Mukhtar as-Susi. He headed the program of study in the royal palace under Sultans Abd al-Hafid, Yusuf, and Muhammad V.

He was among a number of Moroccan scholars—including Allal al-Fassi, Muhammad al-Mukhtar as-Susi, and —that led a nationalist, reformist Salafi movement that was intellectually affiliated with the  opposed to French colonialism.

Legacy 
Chouaib Doukkali University in al-Jadida bears his name.

References 

Moroccan Sunni Muslim scholars of Islam
1878 births
1937 deaths
Al-Azhar University alumni
Collège Royal (Rabat) faculty